The Hyundai Ioniq is a compact five-door liftback manufactured and marketed by Hyundai. The nameplate Ioniq is a portmanteau of ion and unique. It is marketed as the first automobile to be offered without a standard internal combustion engine, but rather sold in hybrid, plug-in hybrid, and all-electric variants.

The Ioniq Hybrid debuted in South Korea in January 2016, with all three variants debuting at 2016 Geneva and New York auto shows. The hybrid variant launched in its home market in February 2016, followed by the electric model in July 2016. The plug-in hybrid version followed in February 2017.

Following its discontinuation in South Korea in 2021, production of the Ioniq ended in July 2022 in favour of battery electric lineup of Ioniq-badged models starting from the Ioniq 5 crossover with Ioniq 6 and Ioniq 7 to follow.



Ioniq Hybrid 

The Ioniq is Hyundai's first automobile built from the ground up and specifically available as a hybrid or electric powered. It is related to the Kia Niro crossover utility vehicle and Hyundai Elantra, with which it shares a wheelbase and suspension components.

The Ioniq Hybrid was released in South Korea in February 2016. The hybrid was launched in Malaysia in November 2016. Two Ioniq Hybrid trims were available, HEV and HEV Plus. The Ioniq Hybrid was introduced in the United States for the 2017 model year in early 2017, with journalists granted early access in February of that year. Production of the Ioniq Hybrid halted in July 2022.

Drivetrain

The Ioniq is powered by a 1.6-litre Kappa four cylinder Atkinson-cycle engine with 40% thermal efficiency capable of delivering  and an estimated  of torque alone. Power is delivered to the front wheels through six speed dual-clutch transmission. Like many hybrids and electric cars, neither the Ioniq Hybrid nor Electric is suitable for towing a trailer.

The traction battery for the Ioniq Hybrid is a 240 V, 1.56kWh lithium-ion polymer battery which is positioned beneath the rear passenger seats. Accessories and instrumentation are powered by a smaller 12 V battery, also housed under the rear seats. The 12 V accessory battery also uses lithium-ion chemistry, unlike typical hybrid and internal combustion automobiles which typically use a lead-acid accessory battery.

Chassis

Its aerodynamic design helped lower the drag coefficient of the Ioniq down to 0.24. Excessive weight is reduced by utilization of high strength steel for the structure and aluminium for non structural components. The Ioniq uses aluminium in the hood and tailgate, reducing weight by  compared with conventional steel, with no measurable disadvantages in noise or vibration. With a higher usage of lightweight components and a more compact build, the cargo screen cover is about 25% lighter than the types used in other Hyundai models.

The hybrid version competes with, and surpasses in fuel economy, the previous mileage leader in the Toyota Prius. The Ioniq is also available with a 17-inch alloy rim option. Trims that include the alloy rims produce approximately 5MPG lower overall fuel economy on the highway.

Many parked Ioniq vehicles appear in the early scenes of the 2018 film Johnny English Strikes Again, starring Rowan Atkinson.

Ioniq Electric 

The Hyundai Ioniq Electric is a limited-production all-electric version of the Ioniq that is sold only in select countries and US states. The car was refreshed for the 2020 model year with a new interior, larger battery, and increased range and traction motor output.

Initially, the Ioniq Electric was available in the United States in California only. As of 2019, Hyundai USA sells the Ioniq Electric only in select states. It is sold by Hyundai in other countries as well, which  included Canada, Norway, Netherlands, Portugal and Switzerland. The car was discontinued in the US market for the 2022 model year.

Drivetrain and chassis
The Ioniq Electric is bundled with the portable "In-Cable Control Box" (ICCB), an electric vehicle supply equipment that allows drivers to charge their Ioniq using a conventional household outlet, but this is recommended only for use in emergencies in countries with 120V AC outlets. In most countries with 220240V AC household outlets, 100% range can be added with an overnight charge. The charging plug of the car is located in a position where fuel fillers are normally located; the vehicle is equipped with a CCS Combo 1 inlet, accepting charging rates at up to 100 kW at a DC fast charging station.

The Ioniq features paddle shifters to allow drivers to choose from one of four levels of regenerative braking. Single-pedal control is not possible: the driver must use the brake pedal to come to a complete stop, even at maximum regeneration. There are three driving modes (Eco / Normal / Sport) which affect throttle tuning; in addition, Eco decreases the output of the climate control system. For the 2020 model year, holding the regeneration paddle enabled maximum regeneration and one-pedal driving.

The rear suspension was switched to a torsion beam instead of the multilink setup used on the Ioniq Hybrid to accommodate the larger traction battery, which is carried under the rear seat.

Range and efficiency 

With these ratings, the Ioniq Electric became in November 2016 the most efficient EPA certified vehicle considering all fuels and of all years, surpassing the 20142016 model year BMW i3, and also the 2017 Toyota Prius Prime, the most energy efficient plug in hybrid in EV mode. Similarly the Ioniq Electric was praised by the Green NCAP for high energy efficiency, even under high-load highway test.

Range from the relatively modest battery was increased by the vehicle's efficiency, which in turn was aided by aerodynamic tweaks and low-rolling resistance tires.

Charging time is rated at 4 hours on a 6.6kW AC charger. Using a DC fast charging station, the battery can be restored to 80% state of charge in approximately half an hour. Along with the larger battery, the onboard AC charger was upgraded from 6.6 kW to 7.2 kW with the 2020 model year Ioniq Electric.

Ioniq Plug-in 

The plug-in hybrid variant was released in February 2017.

In ECO mode, the dual clutch transmission optimizes gear selection for efficiency, upshifting earlier to achieve better fuel economy. There is a charge-replenishing mode where the gasoline engine is used to recharge the traction battery - for example, when the combustion engine is being used for heating during cold season.

Sales
By January 2021, from the Ioniq series around 325,500 units were sold worldwide, including 211,755 conventional hybrids and 77,972 purely electric cars, as well as 35,757 plug-in hybrid variants. From all units, 118,575 were sold to Europe and 60,354 to the USA. From the IONIQ electric model 36,772 units were sold to Europe; these are 47% or almost the half of the worldwide electric production.

See also 
 Government incentives for plug-in electric vehicles
 Hyundai Sonata PHEV
 List of electric cars currently available
 List of modern production plug-in electric vehicles
 Plug-in electric vehicle

References

External links 

  (electric)
  (hybrid)
  (plug-in hybrid)

Ioniq
Front-wheel-drive vehicles
Hybrid vehicles
2010s cars
Cars introduced in 2016
Plug-in hybrid vehicles
Production electric cars